Church Eaton is a civil parish in the Borough of Stafford, Staffordshire, England.  It contains 26 listed buildings that are recorded in the National Heritage List for England. Of these, one is at Grade II*, the middle of the three grades, and the others are at Grade II, the lowest grade.  The parish contains the villages of Church Easton, High Onn, and Marston, and the surrounding countryside.  The Shropshire Union Canal passes through the parish, and a high proportion of the listed buildings are associated with it, consisting of bridges and mileposts. The other listed buildings are a church, and houses, cottages and farmhouses with associated structures, many of which are timber framed, or have timber framed cores.


Key

Buildings

References

Citations

Sources

Lists of listed buildings in Staffordshire